Coylet is a hamlet on Loch Eck, Cowal peninsula, Argyll and Bute, in West Scotland.

The hamlet is within the Argyll Forest Park, which is itself within the Loch Lomond and The Trossachs National Park. It developed around the Coylet Inn, a coaching inn on the A815 road that leads to Dunoon, the main town on the peninsula.

The name may be derived from Gaelic caol ait, "narrow place".

Popular culture

The 1994 film The Blue Boy is centred around the story of a four-year-old boy drowning in Loch Eck and haunting the Coylet Inn. It was filmed on location at the inn. Starring Emma Thompson and Adrian Dunbar, directed by Paul Murton.

Gallery

References

External links

Highlands and Islands of Scotland
Villages in Cowal